The second season of Cheers, an American situation comedy television series, originally aired on NBC in the United States between September 29, 1983, and May 10, 1984, with 22 episodes. The show was created by director James Burrows and writers Glen and Les Charles and was produced by Charles Burrows Charles Productions in association with Paramount Television. The second season has been released on DVD as a four-disc set.

The show won Emmy Awards, including one for Outstanding Comedy Series, in 1983 and 1984. Critical reception was mostly positive, with negative commentary about the extended romance between Sam and Diane.

Background
During season one (1982–1983), the show's Nielsen ratings were very low, despite strong, positive reviews. Nonetheless, NBC renewed the show for another season, which was announced on March 13, 1983. In mid-1983, reruns improved the show's ratings, which rose into the top 20 for most episodes. Four days before the second season premiered, the show won five Emmy Awards out of thirteen nominations, including an Outstanding Comedy Series of 1982–83. Meanwhile, Taxi and Fame, two shows that were originally part of NBC's 1982–83 Thursday night lineup, struggled with low ratings. Taxi was moved from Thursday to Saturday, and Fame was moved into first-run syndication. As announced in May 1983, the Fall 1983 Thursday lineup consisted of, in order of time sequence starting at 8 pm (Eastern) / 7 pm (Central), Gimme a Break!, Mama's Family, We Got It Made, Cheers and Hill Street Blues. In December, We Got It Made was on hiatus and later moved to Saturdays, Buffalo Bill took over the 9:30 pm time slot, and Cheers was shown at 9 pm.

Cast and characters
 Sam Malone (Ted Danson)—a bartender, bar owner, recovering alcoholic, and ex-baseball player.
 Diane Chambers (Shelley Long)—a college student and waitress. She is often pretentious, annoys customers with her lengthy speeches, and becomes the butt of their jokes.
 Ernie "Coach" Pantusso (Nicholas Colasanto)—an aging bartender and retired baseball coach. Coach is vulnerable to other people's exploits, and is a father figureespecially to Sam and Diane. Although he lacks intelligence, he reveals a glimmer of deep wit.
 Carla Tortelli (Rhea Perlman)—a brassy, divorced waitress. She gives birth to a baby girl and watches her disloyal ex-husband Nick (Dan Hedaya)unseen in the first seasonmarry Loretta, an unintelligent blonde.
 Cliff Clavin (John Ratzenberger)—a mailman. During this season it is revealed that he is Norm's best friend. Cliff constantly makes misleading and trivial references, which others find annoying and excessive. In the first season, Ratzenberger was often credited as a guest star, but he appears in the opening credits of the main cast in this season and thereafter.
 Norm Peterson (George Wendt)—semi-unemployed accountant who during this season separates from, then reconciles with, his wife, Vera.

Sam and Diane finally pair up, but their relationship is dysfunctional and has problems. They have fulfilling casual sex but seem to have little else in common. They constantly compete with each other, argue, break up, and make up again until they end their on-again, off-again relationship at the end of the season.

Episodes

Original air dates of following episodes are not actual premiere dates for some television stations of the United States, like KTUU-TV from Anchorage, Alaska. In those areas, episodes may have been broadcast at later dates.

Ratings 
The second season of Cheers was scheduled against CBS's Simon & Simon and various ABC programs, including the short-lived sitcom It's Not Easy and short-lived medical drama Trauma Center. The season scored an average rating of 17.6 and achieved a 27% audience share in its first seven weeks. At the end of the season, Cheers finished in 35th place in the Nielsen ratings.

Reception 
This season was reviewed at the time of its first broadcast on NBC. According to April 26, 1984, survey from The Philadelphia Inquirer (polled by almost 5,000 people) and an April 1984 survey from The Cincinnati Enquirer, Cheers was one of the top ten favorite programs. David Bianculli from Knight Ridder news agency praised it as "the best comedy on TV". Ron Miller and Steve Sonsky from the same news agency gave the same praise. Sonsky said the show was hilarious, unrealistic, absurd, superbly crafted and " ... its just the way comedy should be: comic exaggeration built on a grain of truth you can identify with".

Other reviews were less than positive. According to Sonsky, Harry Stein writing for  TV Guide said Cheers and shows like it are "destructive". Sonsky wrote that Stein and other critics "call[s] such shows to task for failing to display ... commendable and enduring relationships, based on trust and moral values". Mike Boone from the Montreal newspaper The Gazette wrote that the romance between Sam and Diane lasted far too long, spoiled the atmosphere of the bar, and transformed the supporting cast into a "Greek chorus of concerned bystanders". Fred Rothenberg from Associated Press said the program's second season "had some great shows, but dwelled incessantly on the conflict between Sam and Diane without developing the other characters .

Twenty years after the series was first broadcast, reviews grew more positive. Adam Arseneau from DVD Verdict gave the series a rating of 90 percent on the story and 93 percent on acting. Shannon Nutt from DVD Talk rated it four stars out of five for content. Kyle Crawford from TheBoxSet.com called it "smartly written and well acted". Robert David Sullivan ranked the two-part season finale "I'll Be Seeing You" at number four in his list of top 100 favorite sitcom episodes, and wrote that trying to change each other and hurting each otherphysically or emotionallytook its toll on Sam and Diane's relationship. The A.V. Club graded "I'll Be Seeing You" A−. Meredith Blake of that website wrote that a fight scenewhich she described as a "[t]hree Stooges-esque nose-pinching, face-slapping farce"is "sublimely well-executed, but it also has a troubling subtext". Blake added, "[w]hen Diane expresses her shock over the violence, Sam fires back that he hadn’t hit her as hard as he wanted to. It sounds less like a defense of his behavior than a confession to even darker emotions." TV Guide named "How Do I Love Thee... Let Me Call You Back" a "classic episode".

Production
In response to criticism on Diane and Sam's relationship, Cheers creators said that they still entertained viewers without diminishing the show's quality and going out of character. Les Charles, the co-creator, co-writer, and producer of Cheers, said that the on-and-off relationship between Sam and Diane would evolve into consummation and was never meant to last. Charles said that Sam and Diane have strong chemistry but incompatible backgrounds. Glen Charles said that Sam and Diane still antagonize each other, no matter what the state of relationship. Director James Burrows said that pairing Diane and Sam was not a mistake and that keeping them apart for the whole season would have been worse. The cliffhanger after their breakup in the two-part season finale "I'll Be Seeing You" was intended so that "[t]he audience will have all summer to wonder whether Sam will ever see Diane again", said Charles. Meanwhile, writers planned to give Diane another love interest for the next season.

On August 25, 1983, a fire broke out at Paramount Studios where Cheers was filmed. Two or three sound stages and four outdoor sets were destroyed; the show's production set and the rest of the studios were unharmed. Diane's apartment is the first place outside the bar to appear on screen since the season premiere "Power Play". John Ratzenberger, who appeared frequently as a guest star in the first season, was billed in the second season as a permanent character on the opening credits. In 1984, NBC renewed the show for its third season (1984–1985).

Accolades 
Cheers received twelve Emmy Award nominations for the 1983–84 season and won four, including Outstanding Comedy Series. Rhea Perlman won Outstanding Supporting Actress in a Comedy Series, David Angell won Outstanding Writing in a Comedy Series for "Old Flames", and Andrew Chulack won Outstanding Film Editing for a Series. Cheers received three Golden Globe nominations for Best Musical/Comedy Series of 1983; Best Actor in a Musical/Comedy Series (Ted Danson), and Best Actress in a Musical/Comedy Series (Shelley Long); neither were won in 1984. Of the nominees for 1984, Shelley Long won a Golden Globe in 1985 as the Best Actress in a Musical/Comedy Series.

DVD release 
This season was released into Region 1 DVD on January 6, 2004, almost twenty years its first television broadcast. Adam Arseneau of DVD Verdict rated the video 91 percent. He rated audio 84 percent and found it "less spectacular".

References 
 Another edition

Notes

Ratings notes 
These sources were accessed at NewsBank, which requires registration. Except where noted, they were originally published in print editions of The Miami Herald newspaper.

External links 
 Production order of Cheers (season 2) at Copyright Catalog
 Click "Set Search Limits", select "Range", select "Motion Pictures" at "Item Type", type "1983" at left box and "1984" at right box, either hit "Enter" or click "Set Search Limits"
 Then, after above step, search by title, type "Cheers", and hit "Enter" or click "Begin search"
 Cheers, season 2 at Internet Movie Database
 Cheers, season 2 at TV Guide

2
1983 American television seasons
1984 American television seasons
Television episodes directed by James Burrows